Kirwan Inlet is an inlet in the southeast corner of Alexander Island,  wide at its mouth and indenting , opening on George VI Sound. The inlet is ice filled and merges almost imperceptibly with the rising ice slopes of Alexander Island to the west. It was roughly mapped in 1949 by the Falkland Islands Dependencies Survey, and named by the UK Antarctic Place-Names Committee for Laurence P. Kirwan, Director and Secretary of the Royal Geographical Society.

See also
 Fauré Inlet
 Mendelssohn Inlet
 Schubert Inlet

References

Inlets of Alexander Island